Schedel is a German surname. It has also a variant, Schèdel. People with the surname include:

 Abraham Schedel (fl. c. 1600), Bohemian printer and corrector
 Hartmann Schedel (1440–1514), German physician, humanist, historian, cartographer and printer
 Sebastian Schedel (1570–1628), German painter and illustrator

References

Surnames of German origin